Clark Maxwell Jr. (August 21, 1934 – January 18, 2011) was an American politician. He served as a Republican member for the 45th district of the Florida House of Representatives. He also served as a member for the 16th district of the Florida Senate.

Life and career 
Maxwell was born in St. Petersburg, Florida. He attended Florida Southern College and served in the United States Army.

In 1974, Maxwell was elected to represent the 45th district of the Florida House of Representatives, succeeding F. Eugene Tubbs. He served until 1978, when he was succeeded by Winston Gardner Jr. In the same year, he was elected to represent the 16th district of the Florida Senate, succeeding Lori Wilson. He resigned in 1983 and was succeeded by Tim Deratany.

Maxwell died in January 2011 at his home in Palm Coast, Florida, at the age of 76.

References 

1934 births
2011 deaths
Politicians from St. Petersburg, Florida
Republican Party Florida state senators
Republican Party members of the Florida House of Representatives
20th-century American politicians